This is a list of educational institutions that were shut down in the course of the 2016 Turkish purges.

On 23 July 2016, President Recep Tayyip Erdoğan shut down 1,043 private schools, 1,229 charities and foundations, 19 trade unions, 15 universities and 35 medical institutions in his first emergency decree under the newly adopted emergency legislation.

Universities
The following fifteen private universities, many of them allegedly affiliated to the Gülen movement, were shut down:
 İpek University, Ankara
 Bursa Orhangazi University, Bursa
 Canik Başarı University, Samsun
 Selahattin Eyyubi University, Diyarbakır
 Fatih University, Istanbul.
 Melikşah University, Kayseri
 Mevlana University, Konya
 Şifa University, Izmir
 Turgut Özal University, Ankara
 Zirve University, Gaziantep
 Kanuni University, Adana
 İzmir University, Izmir
 Murat Hüdavendigar University, Istanbul
 Gediz University, Izmir
 Süleyman Şah University, Istanbul

According to re-organization of the Armed Forces, all military academies are closed:
 Air Force Academy
 Gülhane Military Academy of Medicine
 Military Academy
 Naval Academy

Health services 
35 health services/hospitals shut down on 23 July 2016.

 Özel Gümüşiğne Fizik Tedavi Ve Rehabilitasyon Tıp Merkezi, Ankara
 Akpol Tıp Merkezi, Ankara
 Gümüşiğne Ftr Merkezi, Ankara
 Nurlu Göz Hastanesi, Ankara
 Sincan Bilgi Tıp Merkezi, Ankara
 Turgut Özal Üniv. Dializ Merkezi, Ankara
 Turgut Özal Üniv. S.U.A.M., Ankara
 Özel Bahar Hastanesi, Bursa
 Özel Rentıp Hastanesi, Bursa
 Özel Erzurum Şifa Hastanesi, Erzurum
 Özel Şifa Dializ Merkezi, Erzurum
 Özel Primer Hospital Hastanesi, Gaziantep
 Fatih Üniversitesi Sema U.A. Merkezi, İstanbul
 Özel Burç Genetik Hastalıkları Tanı Merkezi, İstanbul
 Özel Donegen Genetik Hastalıkları Tanı Merkezi, İstanbul
 Özel İstanbul Kadın Sağlığı Ve Tüp Bebek Merkezi, İstanbul
 İzmir Şifa Üniversitesi Bornova Dializ Merkezi, İzmir
 İzmir Şifa Üniversitesi Bornova Sağl. Uyg. Arş. Merkezi, İzmir
 Hacettepe Ftr Merkezi, Kayseri
 Özel Kayseri Göz Hastanesi, Kayseri
 Mevlana Üniversitesi Dializ Merkezi, Konya
 Mevlana Üniversitesi Hastanesi, Konya
 Özel Kütahya Kent Hastanesi, Kütahya
 Özel Altınova Hastanesi, Sakarya
 Özel Ailemiz Tıp Merkezi, Şanlıurfa
 Özel Anadolu Göz Hastalıkları Dal Merkezi, Şanlıurfa
 Özel Baran Tıp Merkezi, Şanlıurfa
 Özel Doğa Tıp Merkezi, Şanlıurfa
 Özel Harranmed Kadın Hastalıkları Ve Doğum Dal Merkezi, Şanlıurfa
 Özel Kurtuluş Dahiliye Dal Merkezi, Şanlıurfa
 Özel Osm Ortadoğu Hastanesi, Şanlıurfa
 Özel Ufuk Tıp Merkezi, Şanlıurfa
 Özel Urfa Ftr Dal Merkezi, Şanlıurfa
 Özel Uzmanlar Tıp Merkezi, Şanlıurfa
 Özel İstanbul Kadın Doğum Ve Cerrahi Hastanesi, Van

References

External links
 Full list of institutions shut down on 23 July 2016

Institutions shut down
2016–17 purges in Turkey